Folk racing or folkrace is a popular, inexpensive, and entry-level form of Nordic rallycross that originally comes from Finland, where it is also called jokkis or Jokamiehenluokka (everyman's class).

About

The races are run on special gravel or tarmac tracks,  in length. The competitions are divided into different classes depending on age and gender. Participants can be as young as 14 years of age.

The race is divided into different heats in which 6 cars usually compete. The driver who wins a race is awarded seven points; the runner-up receives five points; the driver who finished third gets four points, and so on. When all the heats have been driven, the total score is calculated and the top six drivers get to race in the A final, the next six in the B final, and so on. The winner of the A final wins the event.

To maintain its inexpensive nature, there is a rule on car costs. The races are run in standard cars which must meet certain minimum safety regulations. In Finland, cars must not be all-wheel drive and cannot be powered by diesel engines; they must also be family cars with a minimum of 4 seats, and no mid-engine layout.  Anyone can place a fixed-price bid on any car, and the buyer is then chosen by draw. The fixed price in Finland is €2,000 (≈US$1,650) or 8,000 SEK (≈US$1,000) in Sweden. Refusing to sell is grounds for having one's competition licence revoked; however, participants with handicaps can get an exemption if they require special equipment in their cars. Personal equipment such as the seat and safety harness are not included in the sale. This type of system eliminates the motivation for sinking extensive amounts of work and money into a folk racing car.

Folk racing is a full-contact sport like banger racing. While collisions do happen, and cars make contact with each other, intentionally ramming or obstructing a competitor is forbidden, and the safety rules are strict, so that teenagers (14 to 17 years old) and drivers without a regular driver's licence may participate.

In popular culture 
The 2018 video game Wreckfest features folk racing among its variety of demolition derby events.

See also
 Autograss
 British autocross
 FIA Autocross
 Stock car racing

References

External links 
 Bilcross.no - norwegian bilcross
 Ola's Bilsport Sida
 Eriks folkracesida
 https://web.archive.org/web/20060112183055/http://www.sbf.se/info/folkrace
 FIA Finland Folk Racing
 Photo gallery
 Folkrace in Latvia

Resources 

 2017 AKK official rules for Finland
 Contest Rules of SBF for Sweden

Auto racing by type
 Motorsport in Finland
Motorsport in Sweden
Rallycross